Nattdjurstid is the fifth full-length album by progressive rock band Kaipa.

Track listing
 "Galen" - 2:45
 "Nattdjurstid" - 5:52
 "Timmar av glas" - 2:12
 "Zepapo" - 3:23
 "Identitetskris" - 4:37
 "Inom oss" - 3:28
 "Speglarna" - 5:45
 "Närmare" - 4:40
 "Väntar en storm" - 5:40

Personnel
 Max Åhman - electric guitar, backing vocals
 Hans Lundin - synthesizer, lead and backing vocals
 Mats Lindberg - bass, backing vocals
 Pelle Andersson - drums, backing vocals
 Adam Bracci - windchimes, cymbals

1982 albums
Kaipa albums